Gary Hayzlett (September 4, 1941) is a former member of the Kansas House of Representatives, who represented the 122nd district from 1991 to 2013.

Major donors
The top 5 donors to Hayzlett's 2008 campaign:
1. Kansas Contractors Assoc 	$1,000
2. Walmart 	$500 	
3. Kan Chamber of Commerce 	$500 	
4. Heavy Constructors Assoc	$500 	
5. Heavy Const Assoc 	$500

References

External links
 Kansas Legislature - Gary Hayzlett
 Project Vote Smart profile
 Kansas Votes profile
 State Surge - Legislative and voting track record
 Campaign contributions: 1996,1998,2000, 2002, 2004, 2006, 2008

Republican Party members of the Kansas House of Representatives
Living people
1941 births
20th-century American politicians
21st-century American politicians